The Beginning is the debut studio album by Norwegian DJ and electronic music duo Broiler. It was released in Norway as a digital download on 4 November 2013. The album includes the singles "Afterski", "Vannski", "En gang til" and "Bonski". It has peaked to number 6 on the Norwegian Albums Chart.

Singles
 "Afterski" was released as the lead single from the album on 15 November 2012. The song peaked at number 3 on the Norwegian Singles Chart.
 "Vannski" was released as the lead single from the album on 16 May 2013. The song peaked at number 1 on the Norwegian Singles Chart.
 "En gang til" was released as the lead single from the album on 20 June 2013. The song peaked at number 8 on the Norwegian Singles Chart.
 "Bonski" was released as the lead single from the album on 4 November 2013. The song peaked at number 5 on the Norwegian Singles Chart.

Track listing

Chart performance

Weekly charts

Release history

References

2013 debut albums
DJ Broiler albums